Legacy of Ashes may refer to:

Legacy of Ashes, a 2010 album by the Dutch band Sinister
Legacy of Ashes: The History of the CIA, a 2007 book by Tim Weiner